Mikko Pukka (born September 6, 1982) is a Finnish ice hockey defenceman who currently plays professionally for KOOVEE of Mestis. He previously played in SM-liiga/Liiga for Tappara, TPS, SaiPa and Sport, as well as in Elitserien for Luleå HF.

References

External links

1982 births
Living people
Beibarys Atyrau players
Finnish ice hockey defencemen
HC TPS players
IF Björklöven players
Kiekko-Vantaa players
Kokkolan Hermes players
KooKoo players
Lempäälän Kisa players
Luleå HF players
Rubin Tyumen players
SaiPa players
Tappara players
Vaasan Sport players
HK Dukla Michalovce players
Finnish expatriate ice hockey players in Slovakia
Finnish expatriate ice hockey players in Sweden
Finnish expatriate ice hockey players in Hungary
Finnish expatriate ice hockey players in Russia
Finnish expatriate ice hockey players in Kazakhstan